Hydrea may refer to: 
 Hydra island
 A brand name for the medication hydroxycarbamide